Typhoon Sarah, as known as the Miyakojima Typhoon in Japan was among the deadliest typhoons on record in the western Pacific Ocean, killing around 2,000 people. It formed during the peak of the busy 1959 Pacific typhoon season near Guam, and moved generally to the west-northwest. Sarah turned to the north and northeast, weakening from its peak intensity. Sarah later became extratropical over the Japanese island of Hokkaido on September 18, although the remnants persisted for several days, crossing into the Russian Far East and later dissipating on September 23.

On Miyako-jima, Sarah damaged all of the crops and destroyed about 6,000 houses. Damage was estimated at $2 million, and there were seven deaths. The damage prompted the Japan Meteorological Agency to give Sarah the special name of the "Miyakojima Typhoon". However, the effects were worst in South Korea, and Sarah was described as the worst typhoon there in 50 years. High winds and waves heavily damaged the port of Busan. Nationwide, the storm destroyed over 14,000 homes and left 782,126 people homeless, causing over $100 million in damage. At least 669 people were killed in South Korea, and an additional 1,200 fishermen were lost offshore the country. In Japan, widespread flooding killed 47 people and destroyed 16,632 homes.

Meteorological history

On September 10, a tropical disturbance persisted within the Intertropical Convergence Zone near Pohnpei. On that basis, the Joint Typhoon Warning Center classified the system as Tropical Depression Sarah. The depression passed near or just north of Guam, as tracked by radar. Early on September 12, the JTWC upgraded Sarah to a tropical storm after the circulation became better defined. The storm exhibited a parabolic trajectory that was slightly to the west of the typical September storm. It moved westward initially but gradually curved to the northwest.

Subsequent analysis estimated that the typhoon attained these winds at 00:00 UTC that day. At 12:00 UTC on September 14, the JTWC estimated that Sarah intensified to the equivalent of a Category 5 on the Saffir–Simpson scale, based on aircraft estimates.

About three hours after Sarah reached peak winds, the typhoon moved directly over Miyako-jima, an island of Japan east of Taiwan. Sarah weakened while curving to the north, and it passed west of Okinawa late on September 15. The typhoon turned and accelerated to the northeast toward the Korean peninsula, re-intensifying slightly. By late on September 16, the winds increased to  while Sarah passed just east of Jeju island. That day, Sarah made landfall a few miles west of Busan, South Korea at that intensity; this made Sarah the strongest typhoon to strike the country since records began in 1904, and it remained as such until Typhoon Maemi surpassed it in 2003. The typhoon very quickly emerged into the Sea of Japan, its circulation becoming poorly defined. On September 18, Sarah became extratropical after moving over the northern Japanese island of Hokkaido. The remnants continued to the northeast initially before turning sharply westward, passing over Sakhalin. The circulation progressed into Primorsky Krai in the Russian Far East before turning back east. Former Typhoon Sarah struck Sakhalin a second time on September 20 while moving east-southeastward. After passing through the Kuril Islands, the remnants of Sarah dissipated on September 23.

Preparations and impact

Early in its duration, Sarah brought gusty winds and passing showers to Guam.

Shortly after reaching peak intensity, Sarah passed near the island of Miyako-jima. The winds destroyed over 6,000 homes and wrecked all of the crops. Sarah also left the island without power for an extended period of time after damaging power lines. Sarah also sank four fishing boats and damaged seven others. On Miyako-jima, Sarah killed seven people, injured 88 others, and left $2 million in damage. The heavy damage on the island prompted the Japan Meteorological Agency to give Sarah the special name of the "Miyakojima Typhoon". Sarah was part of a series of typhoons striking the island in 1959, causing food shortages that forced the population to change their diet.

Sarah was the worst typhoon to strike the Korean peninsula in 50 years. Damage was heaviest at Busan where the storm struck. The port there sustained over $100,000 in damage, and nearby American military bases had over $900,000 in damage. Coastal floods washed away or damaged 15,379 homes in the Busan area, leaving 25,834 people homeless. The waves also damaged or sank 5,400 boats. Nationwide, floods damaged 127,000 hectares (313,000 acres) of crop fields. Throughout South Korea, Sarah destroyed over 14,000 homes and left 782,126 people homeless, thousands of whom were injured. The Ministry of Social Affairs estimated property damage at over $100 million, and the typhoon killed at least 669 people. After the storm, the CARE relief agency launched an appeal in the United States, collecting $18,500 worth of shoes and underwear for storm victims. The Australian Red Cross also provided assistance to the country, including money, sheets, and blankets. Due to the ongoing Korean War and Sarah, South Korea lost much of its fishing fleet, resulting in diminished catches over the subsequent decades. The typhoon also caused a rise in the wholesale price index, in conjunction with political uncertainty.

A fleet of 46 boats left Oenarodo near Busan on August 28 to fish near Komundo Island. The fleet failed to return after the passage of Typhoon Sarah, and local newspapers reported all 1,200 fishermen were lost.

Before the storm arrived, the United States evacuated planes from Marine Corps Air Station Iwakuni to Misawa Air Base, although Sarah approached closer to the latter base. The storm affected much of the nation, flooding many communities, including 14,360 houses. Across the country, the typhoon damaged 778 boats. The storm also damaged  of crop fields. Nationwide, Sarah destroyed 16,632 homes, injured 509 people, and killed 47.

Overall, Typhoon Sarah caused around 2,000 deaths, making it among the deadliest typhoons on record.

See also

Typhoon Maemi – powerful storm in 2003 that became the strongest typhoon to strike South Korea
Typhoon Emma (1956) – took a similar track near Japan and South Korea three years before Sarah
Typhoon Cora (1966) – 2nd Miyakojima Typhoon
Typhoon Della (1968) – 3rd Miyakojima Typhoon
Typhoon Hinnamnor - a powerful typhoon that made landfall near Busan on September 6, 2022

Notes

References

External links
Blog post about the effects on Miyako-jima (in Japanese)

1959 Pacific typhoon season
Typhoons
Typhoons in Japan
Typhoons in Russia
Typhoons in South Korea
Miyako Islands